Jamil Karzai
Born Kandahar 1976 age 46.He was elected to represent Kabul Province in Afghanistan's Wolesi Jirga, the lower house of its National Legislature, in 2005.
A report on Kabul prepared at the Navy Postgraduate School stated Jamil Karzai is a second cousin to President Hamid Karzai, President of Afghanistan.
It stated he was head of the National Youth Solidarity Party.
It stated he sat on the Internal Security Committee.

References

People from Kabul Province
Living people
Members of the House of the People (Afghanistan)
Jamil
Year of birth missing (living people)